Gerald W. Kingsland (8 March 1930 – 20 March 2000) was a journalist, adventurer, and writer, born and raised in Whitchurch, Buckinghamshire, England. 

After a stint in the British Army where he fought in combat during the Korean War in 1951, he became a successful journalist and publisher in England, then a wine grower in Italy. In 1980 he set out to become a modern Robinson Crusoe seeking a remote tropical island where he could be self-sufficient together with a female companion. He advertised in Time Out magazine in 1980 for a woman to share life with him on a deserted island. When Kingsland was 49, he met 24-year-old Lucy Irvine. They went to Tuin Island, in the Torres Strait between Australia and Papua New Guinea, uninhabited and lacking a dependable water supply, where they nearly perished, but were saved by Badu Islanders. Kingsland and Irvine wrote separate accounts of their adventure. His book, The Islander was published in 1984. Irvine's Castaway was published in 1983. The story was also depicted in the film Castaway. Kingsland was portrayed by Oliver Reed. The role of Lucy Irvine was played by Amanda Donohoe.

Whilst living in Samoa, Kingsland was diagnosed with bowel cancer, returning to the UK in 2000. He died from a heart attack aged 70 in London. 

He had five sons and two daughters (including writer Rosemary Kingsland) from five marriages.

Publications include
	
"From the Whores of Montezuma". Publisher: London : Gerald Kingsland Pub. 1972  (Korean War memories)

 The voyager : the further adventures of the man who wanted to be Robinson Crusoe  - Publisher: Sevenoaks, Kent : New English Library, 1987. 
 In quest of glory : Korean War memoirs - Publisher: Sevenoaks London : New English Library, 1989. 
 Comfort for a Castaway - Publisher: London : Gerald Kingsland Pub., 2000. 
 Robinson Crusoe heute : Leben auf einsamer Insel.

See also 
 Castaway (1983)

External links
 Obituary

1930 births
2000 deaths
People from Aylesbury Vale
British male journalists
Castaways